Hibbertia appressa, commonly known as trailing guinea flower, is a species of flowering plant in the family Dilleniaceae and is endemic to south-eastern Australia. It is a low-lying or scrambling shrub with lance-shaped to egg-shaped leaves and yellow flowers with nine to twelve stamens arranged in a single group.

Description
The midrib on the lower surface of the leaves is covered with flattened hairs, pressed against the surface. There are nine to twelve stamens fused in a single group at the lower half, and there are two carpels. Flowering mainly occurs from September to December.

Taxonomy
Hibbertia appressa was first described in 1998 by Hellmut R. Toelken in the Journal of the Adelaide Botanic Gardens, but the description was not validly published because it lacked a Latin description and the type was not specified. In 2000, Toelken corrected the omissions and the type selected was collected by R.D. Hoogland on Mount Elizabeth in 1970.

Distribution and habitat
Trailing guinea flower grows in moist place in woodland or the edges of forest, often on the lower slopes of mountains in southern Victoria and northern, eastern and south-eastern Tasmania.

See also
List of Hibbertia species

References

appressa
Flora of Victoria (Australia)
Flora of Tasmania
Plants described in 1998
Taxa named by Hellmut R. Toelken